A beauty parade is a synonym for a formal presentation given to a panel in response to a request for tender. This presentation is predominantly oral but may also include a PowerPoint presentation. Beauty parades are now commonplace in the United Kingdom for the provision of legal services where the final fee is likely to be more than 20,000 pounds. The name is an ironic reference to the beauty pageant, suggesting that the tenderer may choose a company for reasons other than important facts.

References

Procurement